Spencer Brown (born November 13, 1998) is an American football running back for the Carolina Panthers of the National Football League (NFL). He played college football at Alabama Birmingham and holds multiple school career rushing records. He was signed by the Panthers as an undrafted free agent in 2021.

Early years 
Spencer was born and raised in Birmingham, Alabama, and attended Mortimer Jordan High School.  As a senior he was selected to the first-team All-Birmingham list after he rushed for 1,972 yards on 304 carries and tallied 33 total touchdowns.  Brown was ranked as a two-star high school prospect by 247sports.

College career 
As a true freshman at UAB in 2017, Brown appeared in all 13 games and made nine starts.  He rushed for 1329 yards, which was the third-most yards in school history and added 10 touchdowns.  He broke Jordan Howard's freshman rushing record in his eighth game.  On November 4, 2017, he scored three touchdowns in a game against Rice.  Had his first career 100-yard rushing game in week 2 against Ball State with 151 yards on 17 carries.  He was named to the FWAA Freshman All-America Team, named Conference USA's Freshman of the Year, second-team All-Conference, and named to the Doak Walker Award watchlist.

As a sophomore, Brown was named first-team All-Conference USA and awarded the Conference USA Championship Game MVP award.  He set a school record with 16 touchdowns and rushed for 1,227 yards.  In 2019, Brown became UAB's career rushing leader and set the school record for 100-yard rushing games as he had rushed for 100 yards for the 13th time.  As a senior, Brown again won the Conference USA Championship Game MVP award and became UAB's all time rushing touchdown leader.  He is the only player in Conference USA history to be named Conference USA Championship Game MVP twice.  He finished his collegiate career second among active players in rushing yards and was one of two players to have eclipsed 4,000 career rushing yards.

Professional career 
Brown signed with the Carolina Panthers after going undrafted in the 2021 NFL Draft on May 2, 2021. He played in the Panther's first preseason game on August 15, 2021 against the Indianapolis Colts, rushing for 25 yards on nine carries. He was waived on August 31, 2021, and re-signed to the practice squad the next day. He signed a reserve/future contract with the Panthers on January 10, 2022.

On August 30, 2022, Brown was waived/injured by the Panthers and placed on injured reserve. He was released on September 9. He was re-signed to the practice squad on October 18. He signed a reserve/future contract on January 9, 2023.

References

Further reading

Smith, Bradley (August 10, 2021). "Panthers 2021 season opener countdown: 33 days to go". Catscratchreader.com. Retrieved August 23, 2021.

1998 births
Living people
People from Jefferson County, Alabama
Players of American football from Alabama
American football running backs
UAB Blazers football players
Carolina Panthers players